The 1954 Marquette Warriors football team was an American football team that represented Marquette University as an independent during the 1954 college football season. In its first season under head coach Frosty Ferzacca, the team compiled a 3–5–1 record and was outscored by a total of 216 to 136. The team played its home games at Marquette Stadium, sometimes referred to as Hilltop Stadium, in Milwaukee.

Schedule

References

Marquette
Marquette Golden Avalanche football seasons
Marquette Warriors football